Burtscheid Abbey was a Benedictine monastery, after 1220 a Cistercian nunnery, located at Burtscheid, near Aachen, North Rhine-Westphalia, in Germany.

History
The abbey was founded in 997 under Emperor Otto III. The first abbot, Gregor, who came to Burtscheid from Calabria, is sometimes said to have been the brother of Theophanu, Byzantine mother of the Emperor. He was buried beneath the altar after his death in 999, and his date of death, 4 November, was kept as a feast day until the dissolution of the abbey.

In 1018 the Emperor Henry II endowed it with the surrounding territory. Also at about this time the monastery was raised to the status of an abbey, and the dedication was changed from Saints Nicholas and Apollinaris to Saints John the Baptist and Nicholas.

In 1138, the abbey was made reichsfrei by Conrad III, being granted Imperial immediacy, the privilege of being subject only to the Holy Roman Emperor, rather than to an intermediate lord. The abbey was under the Vogtei (loosely "protectorship") of the Barony of Mérode until the abbey purchased its Vogtei from them, in 1649.

In 1220, under Emperor Frederick II and his chancellor, Archbishop Engelbert of Cologne, the Benedictines were evicted and replaced by Cistercian nuns who had previously been living at the Salvatorberg in Aachen, to whom the abbey's possessions were transferred. At the same time the abbey's reichsfreiheit was confirmed.

The abbey church was rebuilt in the mid-14th century, and again between 1735 and 1754 by the architect J.J. Couven.

In 1779, despite the refusal of permission by the council of Aachen, who by that time were responsible for local government in Burtscheid, the then abbess introduced a gambling house, and the street is still known today as Krugenofen Kasinostrasse.

Burtscheid was occupied by French troops in December 1792, and from September 1794 until 1804. They used the abbey church for the manufacture of balloons. In August 1802 the nunnery was secularised and dissolved.

The remaining abbey buildings are now used by a school and for residential and administrative purposes.

References

Further reading
 Christian Quix: Geschichte der ehemaligen Reichsabtei Burtscheid, von ihrer Gründung im 7ten Jahrhunderte bis 1400. Verlag Jakob Anton Mayer, Aachen 1834; new edition 1977  (online)
 Heinrich Schnock: Studien über die Reihenfolge der Äbte und Äbtissinnen in der ehemaligen Herrlichkeit Burtscheid. In: Zeitschrift des Aachener Geschichtsvereins. Band 41, 1919, pp. 205–253 (online)
 Franz Bock: Die Reliquienschätze der ehemaligen gefürsteten Reichs-Abteien Burtscheid und Cornelimünster, nebst den Heiligthümern der früheren Stiftskirche St. Adalbert und der Theresianer-Kirche zu Aachen. Köln 1867 (online)
 Hans Königs: Eine unbekannte Darstellung der Reichsabtei Burtscheid aus dem Jahr 1754. In: Zeitschrift des Aachener Geschichtsvereins. Band 84/85, Aachen 1977/1978, pp. 499–552
 Wilhelm Zimmermann: St. Johann, Aachen-Burtscheid. (= Rheinische Kunststätten. 230). Rheinischer Verein für Denkmalpflege und Landschaftsschutz, Köln 1979
 Thomas Wurzel: Die Reichsabtei Burtscheid von der Gründung bis zur frühen Neuzeit'. Aachen 1984 
 Heinrich von Schwartzenberg: Familien-Wappen und Denksteine der Burtscheider Äbtissinnen. Verein für wissenschaftliches Schrifttum e.V., Göttingen 1987 
 Ernst Günther Grimme: Kirchenschätze der ehemaligen Abteikirche St. Johann und der Pfarrkirche St. Michael in Aachen-Burtscheid. Thouet Verlag, Aachen/ Leipzig/ Paris 1996 
 Herta Lepie: Abteischatz St. Johann Baptist in Aachen-Burtscheid. In: Clemens M. M. Bayer (ed.): Schatzkunst in rheinischen Kirchen und Museen. Schnell + Steiner, Regensburg 2013 , pp. 165–172
 August Schaake: Zur Verfassung und Verwaltung der Cisterzienserinnenabtei Burtscheid von ihrer Entstehung bis um die Mitte des 14. Jahrhunderts'' (inaugural dissertation, University of Münster), Aachen 1913 (online).

External links 

  KuLaDig.de database: Benediktinerabtei Burtscheid, später Zisterzienserinnenkloster
  Germania Sacra: Benediktinerabtei Aachen Burtscheid
  Official website of the town of Burtscheid
  Gesellschaft Burtscheid für Geschichte und Gegenwart (Burtscheid Historical and Civic Society)

990s in the Holy Roman Empire
Buildings and structures completed in 1138
Christian monasteries established in the 10th century
Monasteries in North Rhine-Westphalia
Benedictine monasteries in Germany
Cistercian nunneries in Germany
990s establishments in the Holy Roman Empire
10th-century establishments in Germany
Imperial abbeys disestablished in 1802–03
Religious organizations established in the 1220s
Buildings and structures in Aachen
997 establishments
999
1220 in Europe
1220s in the Holy Roman Empire